Pama Airport  is a public use airport located near Pama, Kompienga Province, Burkina Faso.

See also
List of airports in Burkina Faso

References

External links 
 Airport record for Pama Airport at Landings.com
OurAirports - Pama

Airports in Burkina Faso
Kompienga Province